The Conservative Party of Quebec (CPQ) is a provincial political party in Quebec, Canada. It was authorized on 25 March 2009 by the Chief Electoral Officer of Quebec. The CPQ has gradually run more candidates in successive elections, with 27 in the 2012 general election and 125 (all seats contested) in 2022. The party has not won a seat in the National Assembly of Quebec; however, under leader Éric Duhaime the CPQ won about 12.9% of the popular vote in the 2022 election, a major increase from prior elections. Previously on June 18, 2021 Claire Samson crossed the floor to join the party after having won election in 2018 as a candidate of the governing Coalition Avenir Québec (CAQ).

For the 2014 provincial election, the party used the name "Équipe Adrien Pouliot – Parti conservateur du Québec". For the 2022 provincial election, the party used the name "Parti conservateur du Québec – Équipe Éric Duhaime".

History

Initial phase
In 2009, former Union Nationale Members of the National Assembly of Quebec (MNAs) Serge Fontaine and Bertrand Goulet announced the formation of a new Conservative Party of Quebec.

In November 2009, Fontaine offered Éric Caire, who at the time sat with the Action démocratique du Québec (ADQ), the opportunity to join the party and become its leader, with the goal of attracting disaffected ADQ supporters. This did not materialize and Caire sat as an independent before joining the Coalition Avenir Québec in 2011.

In November 2011, party leader Fontaine left the Conservative Party to join the CAQ led by François Legault.

2012 and later
In January 2012, the party, which still existed on paper, was taken over by the former federal Conservative Member of Parliament (MP) for the Louis-Hébert riding, Luc Harvey, who became its leader.

In contrast to the newly formed CAQ, which is neutral on the sovereignty issue, Harvey said the Conservatives will be federalist, promote a social conservative agenda and a flat tax.

In March 2012, the party's website announced that former Action démocratique du Québec (ADQ) MNAs Monique Roy Verville and Albert De Martin would run for the party in the upcoming election.

On 10 September 2012, it was announced that Harvey was stepping down as party leader. De Martin was named interim leader on 21 September.

In December 2012, De Martin launched a leadership election. As a result, two contenders, Daniel Brisson and Adrien D. Pouliot, declared their intention to run.

In mid-February 2013, Brisson withdrew from the leadership election, leaving Pouliot as the sole candidate.

Pouliot was acclaimed the new leader on 23 February 2013 and immediately put a new constitution forward for the members present at its convention. It was immediately ratified by all the members and refocused the stance of the party to more of a centre-right value system. Later that day, he took a stance against the proposed Parti Québécois laws 14 and 20.

In the 2014 provincial election, the party nominated 60 candidates, who won 16,429 votes, 0.4 percent of the total votes cast in the province. In the 2018 election, these numbers increased to 101 nominated candidates winning 59,055 votes, or 1.5 percent of the total votes.

On 16 October 2020, Adrien Pouliot announced he would be resigning as leader of the party to pursue further business ventures, but opted to stay on until a new leader was elected in the 2021 leadership election, which was won by columnist Éric Duhaime who handily defeated repeat candidate Brisson in a two-way contest.

On 18 June 2021, Claire Samson became the first member of the modern Conservative Party of Quebec to sit in the Quebec legislature. This followed  her expulsion from the CAQ three days prior, after she donated $100 to the Conservative Party of Quebec.

Executive
The Conservative Party of Quebec's executive consists of its leader, its parliamentary representative, its president, its secretary-general, an official agent, an executive director, committee chairs, and regional vice-presidents.
 Leader: Éric Duhaime
 Parliamentary Representative: Claire Samson
 President: Denise Peter
 Vice-President: Donald Gagnon
 Official Agent: Patrice Raza
 Executive Director: Raffael Cavaliere
 Secretary-General & Chairperson of the Constitution Committee: Mikey Colangelo-Lauzon
 Chairperson of the Communications Committee: Véronique Gagnon
 Chairperson of the Finance Committee: Mylène Bouchard
 Chairperson of the Policy Committee: André Valiquette
 Regional Vice-Presidents:
 Bas-Saint-Laurent, Gaspésie-Îles-de-la-Madeleine and Côte-Nord: François Lehouillier
 Montreal and Laval: Patrice Raza
 Capitale-Nationale and Chaudière-Appalaches: Donald Gagnon
 Mauricie, Centre-du-Québec and Saguenay-Lac-Saint-Jean: Jimmy Voyer
 Montérégie and Estrie: Raffael Cavaliere
 Nord-du-Québec, Abitibi-Témiscamingue, Outaouais, Laurentides and Lanaudière: Mark Buzan

Leaders

Election results

Notes

References

Conservative parties in Canada
2009 establishments in Quebec
Political parties established in 2009
Provincial political parties in Quebec
Right-wing politics in Canada
Right-wing parties in North America